Jaime Guillermo Guardia Neyra (10 February 1933 – 16 July 2018) was a Peruvian singer and charango player.  Considered a master of the Ayacucho regional style of traditional Andean music, he performed and recorded as a solo act and with the group Lira Paucina.
He was born in Pauza, Parinacochas Province, department of Ayacucho.

Collaboration with Manuelcha Prado 
When Manuelcha Prado reached Lima he searched pampas and mountains to listen to the wise advice of Jaime Guardia as a popular artist. Manuelcha Prado recalls: "He has always been a guide for all traditional music artist and has showed warmth to everyone". A modest Jaime Guardia said that he had not done anything, that only showed how little he knew: "I have never refused to give what little I know.

External links
 Jaime Guardia - El Charango del Perú
 
 
 Manuelcha Prado - The Saqra of the Guitar

1933 births
2018 deaths
Andean music
20th-century Peruvian male singers
20th-century Peruvian singers
People from Ayacucho Region